Vance County is a county located in the U.S. state of North Carolina. As of the 2020 census, the population was 42,578. Its county seat is Henderson.

Vance County comprises the Henderson, NC Micropolitan Statistical Area, which is also included in the Raleigh-Durham-Chapel Hill, NC Combined Statistical Area, which had a 2012 estimated population of 1,998,808.

History
The Occonacheans Native Americans were the first inhabitants of what became Vance County in 1881. The first white explorer of the region was John Lederer and his Native American guide in 1670.

Originally part of colony of Virginia, King Charles of England redrew the colony lines in 1665, so what is now Vance County became part of the Province of Carolina and then the Province of North Carolina in 1725.

In 1826, the first armed forces academy, the Bingham School, was built by Captain D. H. Bingham in Williamsborough, North Carolina. It served for a short time as a training school for military officers.

In 1871, a hotel called the "Glass House" was opened near the community of Kittrell.  It was so named because of the glass porches surrounding the hotel.  It was a popular resort for hunters and later tuberculosis patients until it burned down in 1895.

As the area that is Vance County prospered in the mid to late 1880s, there were efforts to create a county named "Gilliam" and later as "Dortch". However, Vance County was formed by the white Democratic-dominated legislature in 1881 following the Reconstruction Era from parts of Franklin, Granville, and Warren counties. The county is named after Zebulon Baird Vance, a Governor of North Carolina (1862–65 & 1877–79) and United States Senator (1879–94).

According to the 1955 book, Zeb's Black Baby, by Samuel Thomas Peace, Sr., this was a political decision to concentrate blacks and Republicans in one county and keep Democratic majorities in the other counties, an example of gerrymandering:

"The formation of Vance County was accomplished largely as a political expediency. It was in 1881 when Blacks in large numbers were voting solidly Republican. Granville and Franklin Counties were nip and tuck, Democratic or Republican. From the Democratic standpoint, Warren County was hopelessly Republican. But by taking from Granville, Franklin and Warren, those sections that were heavily Republican and out of these sections forming the new county of Vance, the Democratic party could lose Vance to the Republicans and save Granville and Franklin for the Democrats. [U.S.] Senator Vance was a Democrat. He took kindly to this move and thanked the [North Carolina] Legislature for honoring him with naming the new county after him. At the same time...Vance showed his humor by always referring to Vance County as 'Zeb's Black Baby.'"

In the 1890 Census, Vance County was more than 63 percent African American. In 1894 a biracial coalition of Populists and Republicans elected African American George Henry White to the US Congress and gained control of the state house. The Democrats were determined to forestall this happening again. White strongly opposed the new constitution, saying "I cannot live in North Carolina and be a man and be treated as a man." He left the state after his second term expired, setting up a business in Washington, DC.

The Democrats in the North Carolina legislature settled the political competition with the Republicans by following other southern states and passing a law in 1896 making voting more difficult, and a new constitution in 1899 that disfranchised most blacks by poll taxes, literacy tests and grandfather clauses. Contemporary accounts estimated that 75,000 black male citizens of the state lost the vote. In 1900 blacks numbered 630,207 citizens, about 33% of the state's total population. This situation held until past the mid-20th century and after passage of the federal Voting Rights Act of 1965.

Geography

State and local protected areas 
 Kerr Lake State Recreation Area (part)
 Satterwhite Recreation Area

Major water bodies 
 Buffalo Creek
 Fishing Creek
 Flat Creek
 Island Creek Reservoir
 John H. Kerr Reservoir
 Martin Creek
 Nubush Creek
 Roanoke River
 Ruin Creek
 Sandy Creek
 Tabbs Creek
 Tar River

Adjacent counties
 Mecklenburg County, Virginia - north
 Warren County - east
 Franklin County - south
 Granville County - west

Major highways

Demographics

When originally established in 1881, the population of Vance County was approximately 9,000.  From 1930 through 1970, the rural county population declined and growth slowed markedly as many blacks migrated to the North for better jobs and other opportunities in the Great Migration. Combined with other economic changes, this resulted in the county losing what had been its large African-American majority by the late 20th century. In the early 21st century, the white and black populations are nearly equal.

2020 census

As of the 2020 United States census, there were 42,578 people, 16,875 households, and 11,163 families residing in the county.

2000 census
As of the census of 2000, there were 42,954 people, 16,199 households, and 11,647 families residing in the county.  The population density was 169 people per square mile (65/km2).  There were 18,196 housing units at an average density of 72 per square mile (28/km2).  The racial makeup of the county was 48.21% White, 48.31% Black or African American, 0.20% Native American, 0.39% Asian, 0.03% Pacific Islander, 2.03% from other races, and 0.84% from two or more races.  4.56% of the population were Hispanic or Latino of any race.

There were 16,199 households, out of which 33.50% had children under the age of 18 living with them, 47.00% were married couples living together, 20.40% had a female householder with no husband present, and 28.10% were non-families. 24.20% of all households were made up of individuals, and 9.90% had someone living alone who was 65 years of age or older.  The average household size was 2.60 and the average family size was 3.06.

The county had the highest teen pregnancy rate in the state for the year 2005 as researched by the Adolescent Pregnancy Prevention Coalition of North Carolina.  The rate was 110.4 per 1000 teens, significantly above the state average of 61.7 per 1000 teens.

In the county, the population was spread out, with 27.10% under the age of 18, 8.90% from 18 to 24, 28.80% from 25 to 44, 22.60% from 45 to 64, and 12.60% who were 65 years of age or older.  The median age was 35 years. For every 100 females there were 89.70 males.  For every 100 females age 18 and over, there were 84.30 males.

The median income for a household in the county was $31,301, and the median income for a family was $36,389. Males had a median income of $28,284 versus $21,433 for females. The per capita income for the county was $15,897.  About 16.30% of families and 20.50% of the population were below the poverty line, including 27.70% of those under age 18 and 19.30% of those age 65 or over.

Government and politics

Vance County is governed by a seven-member board of Commissioners, who appoint a county manager Vance County is a member of the Kerr-Tar Regional Council of Governments.

Education

 Vance County Schools
 Henderson Collegiate (public charter school, opened in the Summer of 2010)
 Vance Charter School
 Kerr-Vance Academy (founded in 1968)
 Crossroads Christian School
 Victory Christian Academy
 Vance-Granville Community College

Historical schools
 Henderson Male Academy (whites only)
 Henderson Female Academy (whites only)
 Kittrell College, It was established as Kittrell Industrial Normal School for black males by the North Carolina General Assembly on March 7, 1787.  It was renamed Kittrell Normal and Industrial Institute on January 30, 1889.  It was renamed Kittrell College in 1901. It was closed in 1931 and then reopened from 1934 to 1948.  It was operated as a high school from 1953 to 1965 and college from 1953 to 1975 when it was permanently closed.
 Middleburg Male Academy (also called Middleburg School, whites only, founded by Albert Anderson in the late 1800s)
 Townesville School (whites only)
 West End School

Communities

City
 Henderson (county seat, and largest city. Area was first settled in the early 1700s, founded in 1841 in Granville County, first post office September 28, 1838)

Towns
 Kittrell (founded in 1885, formerly Kittrell's Depot, Linbank, and Stauton in Granville County)
 Middleburg (formerly Middleburgh, Warren County)

Census-designated place
 South Henderson

Unincorporated communities
The unincorporated communities in Vance County have included

 Adcock Crossroads
 Bearpond (post office discontinued in 1903)
 Bobbitt (post office discontinued in 1907)
 Brookston (post office discontinued in 1906, formerly Warren County)
 Bullocksville
 Carlton (post office discontinued in 1905)
 Cokesbury (also Cokes, post office discontinued in 1905
 Dabney, post office from December 3, 1883, to March 15, 1935
 Drewry
 Epsom (Epsom Sandy Creek, portions in Franklin County, post office discontinued in 1908)
 Faulkner Crossroads
 Flint Hill
 Floytan Crossroads
 Gill
 Gillburg (post office discontinued in 1906)
 Greenway
 Greystone (formerly Strickland, post office discontinued in 1932)
 Harris Crossroads
 Hicks Crossroads
 Knotts Crossroads
 Mobile
 Steedsville (post office discontinued in 1894)
 Townsville (established about 1821, formerly Lynesville before 1851, formerly in Granville County)
 Tungsten (post office discontinued in 1959)
 Watkins (post office discontinued in 1906)
 Weldons Mill
 West End
 Williamsboro (post office discontinued in 1905, Williamsboro since 1897, formerly Williamsborough in Granville County from about 1755, formerly Lick, formerly Nutbush))
 Woodworths (established about 1830, post office discontinued in 1914)
 Vicksboro

Townships
By the requirements of the North Carolina Constitution of 1868, counties were to be divided into townships, which were solely administrative divisions of the county. The following township make up Vance County:

 Dabney
 Henderson
 Kittrell
 Middleburg
 Sandy Creek
 Townsville
 Watkins
 Williamsboro

Notable people
 Rufus Sidney McCoin (1872  ?) (representative of Vance County)
 Henry P. Cheatham (18571935), one of only five African Americans elected to Congress from the South in the Jim Crow era
 Ben E. King (singer/musician)

See also
 List of counties in North Carolina
 National Register of Historic Places listings in Vance County, North Carolina
 North Carolina State Parks

References

Further reading

External links

 
 
 Henderson-Vance Chamber of Commerce
 Vance County Economic Development Commission
 NCGenWeb Vance County
 The Daily Dispatch, Henderson, North Carolina

 
1881 establishments in North Carolina
Populated places established in 1881
Majority-minority counties in North Carolina